Cyril Harold Goulden (2 June 1897, in Bridgend, Wales – 4 February 1981, in Ottawa) was an eminent Welsh/Canadian geneticist, statistician and agronomist who studied under Karl Pearson.

Son of a homesteader, Goulden took the course for farmers at the University of Saskatchewan and went on to do a PhD in plant breeding before becoming chief cereal breeder at the Dominion Rust Research Laboratory, Winnipeg, in 1925.

In 1948 he succeeded L.H. Newman as Dominion cerealist and later became assistant deputy minister for research in the Department of Agriculture.

In 1937 Goulden wrote the first North American textbook on biostatistics.

On May 14, 1954 when receiving an Honorary Degree from his alma mater, Goulden was greeted thus:
Eminent Chancellor: I present to you a man whose name is indeed golden in the ears of prairie farmers, because he makes two stems of wheat grow where previously one had sickened and remained barren. He has been a general in the continuing warfare with the farmers' great and resourceful enemy, disease of cereal crops, frustrating that enemy by creating new varieties which it is powerless to attack. His latest creation to meet the latest thrust of the enemy, rust form 15B, has only recently been released and appropriately christened "Selkirk."

A distinguished alumnus of this university, Goulden was for many years in charge of the breeding of cereals at the Federal Rust Research Laboratory in Winnipeg. His achievements there included not only the successful production of new varieties but also much fundamental research which lay behind that success. At the same time he became known internationally as an investigator and author in the field of statistics particularly as applied to biological and agricultural problems. 
At present as Chief of the Division of Cereals of the Canada Department of Agriculture he holds one of Canada's most important scientific posts, directs the researches on cereal crops conducted by that department throughout the country, and influences all similar work in other institutions.

Eminent Chancellor, on behalf of the Council and Senate of this university I ask that you confer on Cyril Harold Goulden the degree of Doctor of Laws, honoris causa.

He also developed 6 varieties of rust-resistant oats.

References

1897 births
1981 deaths
Canadian people of Welsh descent
Canadian geneticists
Canadian statisticians
Fellows of the American Statistical Association
British emigrants to Canada